Interochromis loocki is a species of cichlid endemic to Lake Tanganyika in East Africa. This species can reach a length of  TL. It is currently the only known member of its genus.

References

Pseudocrenilabrinae
Fish of Lake Tanganyika
Fish described in 1949
Taxobox binomials not recognized by IUCN